The 2019 Vale of White Horse District Council election took place on 2 May 2019 to elect members of Vale of White Horse District Council in England. This was held on the same day as other local elections as part of the 2019 United Kingdom local elections. The election saw a landslide for the Liberal Democrats, who regained control of the council from the Conservatives after having previously lost control in 2011.

Election results

|-

Ward Results

George Ryall was the Labour candidate, but appeared on the ballot paper without a party description due to an administrative error.

By-elections 2019-2023

Grove North

Steventon & the Hanneys

References

Vale of White Horse District Council elections
2019 English local elections
2010s in Oxfordshire
May 2019 events in the United Kingdom